The Old Indian Meeting House (also known as the Old Indian Church) is a historic meeting house at 410 Meetinghouse Road in Mashpee, Massachusetts. Built in 1758, the meetinghouse is the oldest Native American church in the eastern United States and the oldest church on Cape Cod.  The building was listed on the National Register of Historic Places in 1998.

Description
The Old Indian Meeting House stands on the east side of Meetinghouse Road, north of its junction with Falmouth Street. It is a 1-1/2 story wood frame structure, with a gabled roof and clapboarded exterior. It has a Greek Revival exterior, with corner pilasters rising to entablatures that run along the roofline on the sides. There are two symmetrically placed entrances on the front facade, each framed by pilasters and a corniced entablature. A triangular transom window is set in the gable above, and there are fixed-pane windows above the entrances.

History
The first church to be built in Mashpee was built in 1670.  In 1684, a second meeting house was built on the site of the first by Deacon John Hinckley.  That building was moved about 1717 to another site in Mashpee.  In 1758, a meeting house is described as being at the present site; it is unclear whether this was an altered version of the 1684 building, moved to this site and enlarged, or whether it was a new construction.  It was used by the Wampanoag Native Americans as a  Christian church. In 1717 the church was moved from its original location in the town to its current one, and the building was remodeled.  The building also served as a school. In the late eighteenth century, a cemetery ("burial ground") was founded on the church grounds.

With almost four centuries of Native American leadership and ministry, the Old Meeting House is a place of historic and spiritual significance to the Mashpee Wampanoag tribe. In 1833 it was the site of the famous Mashpee Revolt, when tribal members and their minister, William Apess (Pequot), protested state intrusions on their self-governance, and white settlers' theft of wood from tribal lands. The site was re-dedicated in 1923 under the leadership of Nelson D. Simons, and the site was added to the National Register of Historic Places in 1998. In 2009, the Mashpee tribe celebrated its reconstruction and formal re-opening.

See also
Oldest churches in the United States
National Register of Historic Places listings in Barnstable County, Massachusetts
Praying Indian

References

1684 establishments in Massachusetts
17th-century churches in the United States
Religious buildings and structures completed in 1684
Cemeteries on the National Register of Historic Places in Massachusetts
Churches in Barnstable County, Massachusetts
Churches on the National Register of Historic Places in Massachusetts
Colonial architecture in Massachusetts
Greek Revival church buildings in Massachusetts
Italianate architecture in Massachusetts
Mashpee, Massachusetts
National Register of Historic Places in Barnstable County, Massachusetts